In film, an insert is a shot of part of a scene as filmed from a different angle and/or focal length from the master shot. Inserts cover action already covered in the master shot, but emphasize a different aspect of that action due to the different framing. An insert differs from a cutaway as cutaways cover action not covered in the master shot.

There are more exact terms to use when the new, inserted shot is another view of actors: close-up, head shot, knee shot, two shot. So the term "insert" is often confined to views of objects—and body parts, other than the head. Often inserts of this sort are done separately from the main action, by a second-unit director using stand-ins.

Inserts and cutaways can both be vexatious for directors, as care must be taken to preserve continuity by keeping the objects in the same relative position as in the main take, and having the lighting be the same.

In popular culture 
The 1975 movie Inserts directed by John Byrum about a pornographic film production, which starred Richard Dreyfuss and was originally released with an X rating, took its name from the double meaning that "insert" both refers to this film technique (often used in pornographic filmmaking) and to sexual intercourse.

See also

Continuity editing
Cutaway (filmmaking)

References 

Cinematography
Cinematic techniques
Film editing
Pornography terminology